This table shows an overview of the protected heritage sites in the Walloon town Les Bons Villers. This list is part of Belgium's national heritage.

|}

See also
 List of protected heritage sites in Hainaut (province)
Les Bons Villers

External links
 Belgian heritage register: Direction générale opérationnelle - Aménagement du territoire, Logement, Patrimoine et Energie (DG4)
 Dglive.be

Les Bons Villers